Nura Bazdulj-Hubijar (born 20 August 1951) is a Bosnian writer, poet and playwright. Born near Foča, she attended school and medical college in Sarajevo after which she moved to Travnik. In addition to her work in medical microbiology, she has published many novels, poems and plays. She also contributes to children's magazines. She received the VBZ Award 2005.

Her son is a writer Muharem Bazdulj.

Works

"Ja, slavni Ja", poems for children ("Drugari", Sarajevo, 1988.),
"Ruža", novel for young adults ("Veselin Masleša", Sarajevo, 1990)
"Ljubav je sihirbaz babo", novel ("Svjetlosti", Sarajevo, 1994.)
"Naše međutim je rat", novel ("Bosanska knjiga", Sarajevo, 1995.)
"Rosa canina", novel ("Međunarodni centar za mir", Sarajevo, 1996.)
"Okrutnost raja", novel (Društvo pisaca BiH, 1997.) 
"Braća", drama ("Mizanscen", 1998)
"Amanet", novel ("Šahinpašić", Sarajevo, 1999.)
"Baš mi je žao" 2nd edition ( R&S, Tuzla, 1999.)
"Kako sam ribu učio da pliva", novel (OKO, Sarajevo, 2000.)
"Šta te muči, Tamaguči", novel ("Sezam", 2000.)
"Bizarne storije" ("Svjetlost", Sarajevo, 2001)
"Čekajući Tahira" : Ruža II, (Bosanska riječ, Sarajevo, 2002.)
"Sablja i pero" (Sejtarija, Sarajevo, 2002.)
"Priče o slovima" (Svjetlost, Sarajevo, 2002.)
"Duša i cvijet" (Sejtarija, Sarajevo, 2003.)
"Noć u brelima", novel (Sejtarija, Sarajevo, 2003.)
"Nevjestinski ponor", (Buybook, Sarajevo, 2004.)
"Kad je bio juli", (VBZ,2005.)
"Više ne čekam Tahira" : Ruža III, (Šahinpašić, 2008.)
"Smrt je došla prekasno", (Šahinpašić, 2008.)
"Priča o Zlatanu i vili izvorkinji", (Šahinpašić, 2008.)
"Doba nevinosti", (Šahinpašić, II izdanje 2008.)
"Plavi kombi",(Šahinpašić, 2009.)
"I ja njega volim : Plavi kombi II",(Šahinpašić, 2010.)
"Sjećanje na plava brda", (TKD Šahinpašić, 2010.) 
"Spavaj Anđela" (Amanet II) (TKD Šahinpašić, 2011.) 
"Noć u brelima", (Šahinpašić, 2012.) 
"Osluhni zašto plače" (Šahinpašić, 2013.)

References

1951 births
Living people
People from Foča
Bosniaks of Bosnia and Herzegovina
Bosniak writers
Bosniak poets
Bosnia and Herzegovina women poets
20th-century Bosnia and Herzegovina writers
20th-century Bosnia and Herzegovina women writers
21st-century Bosnia and Herzegovina writers
21st-century Bosnia and Herzegovina women writers